St Naul's is a Gaelic football club in the parish of Inver in County Donegal, Ireland.

They compete in the Donegal Senior Football Championship.

Several of the club's players have been involved with the Donegal county team.

Former Tánaiste Mary Coughlan has served as secretary of the club.

History
Having had a drought of silverware for some years in the Intermediate Championship, Naomh Naille secured the Intermediate title for the first time since 2011 and again in 2019  to the absolute delight of everyone in the Parish of Inver. Naomh Naille have had continued success in the last 10 years with strong membership at adult and juvenile level and good participation by players at all levels both male and female.
A big emphasis was placed on the development of our cultural and language within the club, seeing the resumption of our Scór participation under the leadership of Annmarie Sheerin and her team. County titles were won by our Ceilí Dancing Troupe in 2016,17 & 18. Our Ballad Group were winners in 2017and we have hosted Scór Sinsir and Scór Na nÓg semi finals to packed houses.Our strong emphasis on health and well-being helped us deal with some tragedies in our club with the sad loss of both players and members. We hope we will be able to continue to support our members and the wider community through any other challenges . “ Our door is always open “.

Notable players
 Stephen Griffin — All-Ireland SFC winner
 Brendan McCole — 2020 Sigerson Cup winner
 Peadar Mogan - Donegal GAA County Player

Managers

Honours
 Donegal Intermediate Football Championship (2): 2011, 2019
 Donegal Junior Football Championship (3): 1962, 1972, 1984

References

Gaelic games clubs in County Donegal
Gaelic football clubs in County Donegal